Cheikh Mwijo (Arabic: الشيخ مويزو), born Moshe Attias in Meknes in 1937 and died on 2 May 2020 in Kiryat Ata, was a Moroccan musician and songwriter. He is one of the icons of Moroccan Jewish music.

Biography 
Born in 1937 in Meknes, Cheikh Mwijo comes from a line of singers and composers. His father Yaakov Attias was a percussionist and used to play in the Mâalem Ben Haroush orchestra.

Cheikh Mwijo began his musical career singing at the age of 25 by performing popular and Malhun songs.

Following the departure of Ben Haroush to Israel, Mwijo joined him in 1962. Aged then 35, he began a new musical career in Haifa by singing and playing the mandolin before switching to the North African violin which is played at the vertical. During his rich career, Mwijo remained closely linked to his original community and his main source of income was his concerts at weddings and events celebrated by the Moroccan Jewish community.

Cheikh Mwijo has a rich repertoire of over 500 songs and recorded more than 100 albums. Besides his humorous songs like "Tanjiya" and "A labnat", Mwijo also sang for peace and coexistence between Jews and Muslims as in his song "Ibrahim Al-Khalil" in which he explains that Abraham is a common ancestor of the two communities and that Ishmael and Isaac have been created by the same god.

References

1937 births
Jewish musicologists
20th-century Moroccan male singers
Moroccan folk singers
Moroccan composers
20th-century Moroccan Jews
2020 deaths
People from Meknes